The Cathedral of Notre Dame of Lausanne is a church located in the city of Lausanne, in the canton of Vaud in Switzerland. It belongs to the Evangelical Reformed Church of the Canton of Vaud.

History 
Construction of the cathedral began as early as 1170 by an original unknown master mason, for the use of the Catholic Church. Twenty years later, another master mason restarted construction until 1215. Finally a third engineer, Jean Cotereel, completed the majority of the existing cathedral including a porch, and two towers, one of which is the current day belfry. The other tower was never completed. The cathedral was consecrated and dedicated to Our Lady in 1275 by Pope Gregory X, Rudolph of Habsburg, and the bishop of Lausanne at the time, Guillaume of Champvent. The medieval architect Villard de Honnecourt drew the rose window of the south transept in his sketchbook in 1270.

The Protestant Reformation, in particular the variant which came from nearby Geneva, significantly affected the cathedral, with it eventually being turned over to a Protestant denomination. In 1536, a new liturgical area was added to the nave and the colourful decorations inside the cathedral were covered over. Other major restorations occurred later in the 18th and 19th century which were directed by the great French architect, Eugène Viollet-le-Duc. During the 20th century major restorations occurred to restore the painted interior decorations as well as to restore a painted portal on the South side of the cathedral. New organs were installed in 2003.

Great organ 
The great pipe organ of the Cathedral of Notre Dame of Lausanne was inaugurated in December 2003. It is a unique instrument in the world. It took ten years to design it and it is composed of 7000 pipes, two consoles, five manuals, and one pedalboard. It is the first organ in the world to be designed by a designer. It is the first organ to contain all four of the principal organ styles (classical, French symphony, baroque, German romantique). It is also the first organ manufactured by an American company (Fisk) for a European cathedral. It cost a total of 6 million Swiss francs, took 150,000 man-hours to build and weighs 40 tons. It was preceded by a Kuhn Organ from 1955 which has since been relocated to the Polish Baltic Philharmonic in Gdańsk, Poland. The organist is Jean-Christophe Geiser.

Guided tours of the great organ are available in English, French and German by request.

The bells 
The cathedral has a total of seven bells that are suspended on two floors of the belfry. The two biggest bells are located on the lower level while all the other bells are on the top level. The oldest bell dates back to 1493 while the most recent bells date back 1898.

The bells are still in use today to mark the hours.

Tomb of Otto de Grandson 
The cathedral has the fourteenth century tomb of the Savoyard knight, Otto de Grandson (c. 1238–1328),the third cousin, lifelong friend and envoy of King Edward I of England. Grandson had been the Justiciar of North Wales, Governor of the Channel Islands and leader of the English knights at the Siege of Acre (1291).

Lookout 
Since 1405 until the present day without interruption, the city of Lausanne has maintained a lookout in the cathedral bell tower. The lookout announces the time by yelling the hour from 10 pm to 2 am, 365 days a year. The lookout cries the hour to each cardinal direction « C'est le guet, il a sonné [dix] » ("It's the lookout, it rang [ten]"). The original purpose of the lookout was to provide a warning in case of fire though it has now become a traditional function. Since 2002, the official lookout is Renato Häusler, who beat out 58 other applicants for the job. He intends to retire in 2024 when he turns 65. The first female lookout, Cassandre Berdoz, was selected as deputy in 2021.

Notes and references

See also 
 List of cathedrals in Switzerland

External links 

 Page on the website of the City of Lausanne

Cathedrals in Switzerland
Cathedral
Reformed church buildings in Switzerland
Cathedral
Gothic architecture in Switzerland
Churches in Vaud
13th-century churches in Switzerland